In mathematics, the adele ring of a global field (also adelic ring, ring of adeles or ring of adèles) is a central object of class field theory, a branch of algebraic number theory. It is the restricted product of all the completions of the global field, and is an example of a self-dual topological ring.

An adele derives from a particular kind of idele. "Idele" derives from the French "idèle" and was coined by the French mathematician Claude Chevalley. The word stands for 'ideal element' (abbreviated: id.el.). Adele (French: "adèle") stands for 'additive idele' (that is, additive ideal element).

The ring of adeles allows one to elegantly describe the Artin reciprocity law, which is a vast generalization of quadratic reciprocity, and other reciprocity laws over finite fields. In addition, it is a classical theorem from Weil that -bundles on an algebraic curve over a finite field can be described in terms of adeles for a reductive group . Adeles are also connected with the adelic algebraic groups and adelic curves.

The study of geometry of numbers over the ring of adeles of a number field is called adelic geometry.

Definition

consisting of the tuples  where  lies in the subring  for all but finitely many places . Here the index  ranges over all valuations of the global field ,  is the completion at that valuation and  the corresponding valuation ring.

Motivation 
The ring of adeles solves the technical problem of "doing" analysis on the rational numbers . The "classical" solution used by people before was to pass to the standard metric completion  and use analytic techniques there. But, as was learned later on, there are many more absolute values other than the Euclidean distance, one for each prime number , as was classified by Ostrowski. This has the advantage of enabling analytic techniques, while also retaining information about the primes since their structure is embedded by the restricted infinite product.

Why the restricted product? 
Harmonic analysis) in the adelic setting. This is analogous to the situation in algebraic number theory where the ring of integers of an algebraic number field embedsas a lattice. With the power of a new theory of Fourier analysis, Tate was able to prove a special class of L-functions and the Dedekind zeta functions were meromorphic on the complex plane.

Another natural reason for why this technical condition holds can be seen directly by constructing the ring of adeles as a tensor product of rings. If defining the ring of integral adeles  as the ringthen the ring of adeles can be equivalently defined asThe restricted product structure becomes transparent after looking at explicit elements in this ring.

Origin of the name 
In local class field theory, the group of units of the local field plays a central role. In global class field theory, the idele class group takes this role. The term "idele" is an invention of the French mathematician Claude Chevalley (1909–1984) and stands for "ideal element" (abbreviated: id.el.). The term "adele" stands for additive idele.

At first glance, the Cartesian product could be a good candidate. However, the adele ring is defined with the restricted product. There are two reasons for this:

 For each element of  the valuations are zero for almost all places, i.e., for all places except a finite number. So, the global field can be embedded in the restricted product.
 The restricted product is a locally compact space, while the Cartesian product is not. Therefore, there cannot be any application of harmonic analysis to the Cartesian product. This is because local compactness ensures the existence (and uniqueness) of Haar measure, a crucial tool in analysis on groups in general.

Examples

Ring of adeles for the rational numbers 
The rationals K=Q  have a valuation for every prime number p, with (Kν,Oν)=(Qp,Zp), and one infinite valuation ∞ with  Q∞=R. Thus an element of

is a real number along with a p-adic rational for each p of which all but finitely many are p-adic integers.

Ring of adeles for the function field of the projective line 
Secondly, take the function field K=Fq(P1)=Fq(t) of the projective line over a finite field. Its valuations correspond to points x of X=P1, i.e. maps over Spec Fq

For instance, there are q+1 points of the form SpecFq → P1. In this case Oν=ÔX,x is the completed stalk of the structure sheaf at x (i.e. functions on a formal neighbourhood of x) and Kν=KX,x is its fraction field. Thus

The same holds for any smooth proper curve X/Fq over a finite field, the restricted product being over all points of x∈X.

Related notions

The group of units in the adele ring is called the idele group

The quotient of the ideles by the subgroup K×⊆IK is called the idele class group

The integral adeles are the subring

Applications

Stating Artin reciprocity 
The Artin reciprocity law says that for a global field K,

where Kab is the maximal abelian algebraic extension of K and  means the profinite completion of the group.

Giving adelic formulation of Picard group of a curve 
If X/Fq is a smooth proper curve then its Picard group is

and its divisor group is Div(X)=AK×/OK×. Similarly, if G is a semisimple algebraic group (e.g. SLn, it also holds for GLn) then Weil uniformisation says that

Applying this to G=Gm gives the result on the Picard group.

Tate's thesis 
There is a topology on AK for which the quotient AK/K is compact, allowing one to do harmonic analysis on it. John Tate in his thesis "Fourier analysis in number fields and Hecke Zeta functions" proved results about Dirichlet L-functions using Fourier analysis on the adele ring and the idele group. Therefore, the adele ring and the idele group have been applied to study the Riemann zeta function and more general zeta functions and the L-functions.

Proving Serre duality on a smooth curve 
If X is a smooth proper curve over the complex numbers, one can define the adeles of its function field C(X) exactly as the finite fields case. John Tate proved that Serre duality on X

can be deduced by working with this adele ring AC(X). Here L is a line bundle on X.

Notation and basic definitions

Global fields 
By definition a finite extension of a global field is itself a global field.

Valuations 

There is a one-to-one identification of valuations and absolute values. Fix a constant  the valuation  is assigned the absolute value  defined as:

Conversely, the absolute value  is assigned the valuation  defined as:

Infinite places of a global field form a finite set, which is denoted by 

Define  and let  be its group of units. Then

Finite extensions 

(Note that both products are finite.)

The adele ring

It is equipped with the restricted product topology, the topology generated by restricted open rectangles, which have the following form:

With component-wise addition and multiplication  is also a ring.

The number of infinite places is finite and the completions are either  or  In short:

With addition and multiplication defined as component-wise the adele ring is a ring. The elements of the adele ring are called adeles of  In the following, it is written as

although this is generally not a restricted product.

Remark. Global function fields do not have any infinite places and therefore the finite adele ring equals the adele ring.

Lemma. There is a natural embedding of  into  given by the diagonal map: 

Proof. If  then  for almost all  This shows the map is well-defined.

Remark.

Definition.

 

Furthermore, if 

the result is:

The adele ring of rationals

Or for short

 

the difference between restricted and unrestricted product topology can be illustrated using a sequence in :

Lemma. Consider the following sequence in :

Proof. In product topology convergence corresponds to the convergence in each coordinate, which is trivial because the sequences become stationary.

Alternative definition for number fields

Definition (profinite integers). The profinite integers are defined as the profinite completion of the rings  with the partial order  i.e.,

Lemma. 

Proof. This follows from the Chinese Remainder Theorem.

Lemma. 

Proof. Use the universal property of the tensor product. Define a -bilinear function

This is well-defined because for a given  with  co-prime there are only finitely many primes dividing  Let  be another -module with a -bilinear map  It must be the case that  factors through  uniquely, i.e., there exists a unique -linear map  such that    can be defined as follows: for a given  there exist  and  such that  for all  Define  One can show  is well-defined, -linear, satisfies  and is unique with these properties.

Corollary. Define  This results in an algebraic isomorphism 

Proof. 

Lemma. For a number field 

Remark. Using  where there are  summands, give the right side receives the product topology and transport this topology via the isomorphism onto

The adele ring of a finite extension

If  be a finite extension, then  is a global field.

Lemma. If  is a finite extension, then  both algebraically and topologically.

With the help of this isomorphism, the inclusion  is given by

Furthermore, the principal adeles in  can be identified with a subgroup of principal adeles in  via the map

Proof.

Furthermore, there are the following isomorphisms:

 

For the second use the map:

 

Corollary. As additive groups  where the right side has  summands.

The adele ring of vector-spaces and algebras

Lemma.

Equip  with the product topology and define addition and multiplication component-wise. Then  is a locally compact topological ring.

Remark. If  is another finite set of places of  containing  then  is an open subring of 

Now, an alternative characterization of the adele ring can be presented. The adele ring is the union of all sets :

Fix a place  of  Let  be a finite set of places of  containing  and  Define

Then:

Furthermore, define

where  runs through all finite sets containing  Then:

via the map  The entire procedure above holds with a finite subset  instead of 

By construction of  there is a natural embedding:  Furthermore, there exists a natural projection

The adele ring of a vector-space

This definition is based on the alternative description of the adele ring as a tensor product equipped with the same topology that was defined when giving an alternate definition of adele ring for number fields. Next,  is equipped with the restricted product topology.

An alternative definition of the topology on  can be provided.

The topology can be defined in a different way. The topology doesn't depend on the choice of the basis, because another basis defines a second isomorphism. By composing both isomorphisms, a linear homeomorphism which transfers the two topologies into each other is obtained. More formally

where the sums have  summands. In case of  the definition above is consistent with the results about the adele ring of a finite extension

The adele ring of an algebra

One can show there is a finite set  so that  is an open subring of  if  Furthermore  is the union of all these subrings and for  the definition above is consistent with the definition of the adele ring.

Trace and norm on the adele ring

Let  be a finite extension.

Let  be a tower of global fields. Then:

Furthermore, restricted to the principal adeles  is the natural injection 

Let  be a basis of the field extension  Then each  can be written as  where  are unique. The map  is continuous. Define  depending on  via the equations:

These are the trace and the determinant of the linear map

They are continuous maps on the adele ring, and they fulfil the usual equations:

 

 

Moreover, it can be proven that:

Properties of the adele ring

Theorem. For every set of places  is a locally compact topological ring.

Remark. The result above also holds for the adele ring of vector-spaces and algebras over 

Theorem.  is discrete and cocompact in  In particular,  is closed in 

Proof. The general case follows via translation. Define

Then:

Next, it can be claimed that:

The reverse implication is trivially true. The implication is true, because the two terms of the strong triangle inequality are equal if the absolute values of both integers are different. With iteration, it can be deduced that there exists  such that  Now select  such that  Then  The continuous projection  is surjective, therefore  as the continuous image of a compact set, is compact.

Corollary. Let  be a finite-dimensional vector-space over  Then  is discrete and cocompact in 

Theorem. The following are assumed:

 is a divisible group. 
 is dense.

Proof. The first two equations can be proved in an elementary way.

By definition  is divisible if for any  and  the equation  has a solution  It is sufficient to show  is divisible but this is true since  is a field with positive characteristic in each coordinate.

For the last statement note that  because the finite number of denominators in the coordinates of the elements of  can be reached through an element  As a consequence, it is sufficient to show  is dense, that is each open subset  contains an element of  Without loss of generality, it can be assumed that

Remark.  is not uniquely divisible. Let  and  be given. Then

both satisfy the equation  and clearly  ( is well-defined, because only finitely many primes divide ). In this case, being uniquely divisible is equivalent to being torsion-free, which is not true for  since  but  and 

Remark. The fourth statement is a special case of the strong approximation theorem.

Haar measure on the adele ring

Definition.

Theorem. Since  is a locally compact group with addition, there is an additive Haar measure  on  This measure can be normalized such that every integrable simple function  satisfies:

The product is finite, i.e., almost all factors are equal to one.

The idele group

Definition.

Remark.   is equipped with a topology so that it becomes a topological group. The sequence

converges to  To see this let  be neighbourhood of  without loss of generality it can be assumed:

Since  for all   for  large enough. However, as was seen above the inverse of this sequence does not converge in 

Lemma. Let  be a topological ring. Define:

It is the coarsest topology, emerging from the topology on  that makes  a topological group.

Proof. Since  is a topological ring, it is sufficient to show that the inverse map is continuous. Let  be open, then  is open. It is necessary to show  is open or equivalently, that  is open. But this is the condition above.

The idele group is equipped with the topology defined in the Lemma making it a topological group.

Definition. For  a subset of places of  set: 

Lemma. The following identities of topological groups hold:

where the restricted product has the restricted product topology, which is generated by restricted open rectangles of the form

Proof. First show the two sets are equal:

Now, it is possible to show the topology on the left-hand side equals the topology on the right-hand side. Obviously, every open restricted rectangle is open in the topology of the idele group.

Lemma. For each set of places,  is a locally compact topological group.

Proof. It being a topological group follows from the above discussion on the group of units of a topological ring.

Since the idele group is a locally compact, there exists a Haar measure  on it. This can be normalised, so that

This is the normalisation used for the finite places. In this equation,  is the finite idele group, meaning the group of units of the finite adele ring. For the infinite places, use the multiplicative lebesgue measure

The idele group of a finite extension

Lemma. Let  be a finite extension. Then:

where the restricted product is with respect to 

Lemma.

Proof.

The case of vector spaces and algebras

The idele group of an algebra

The elements of the idele group are called idele of 

Proposition. Therefore,  is an open and compact subgroup of

Alternative characterisation of the idele group

Proposition. Let  be a finite set of places. Then

is an open subgroup of  where  is the union of all 

Corollary.

is an open subgroup of  Furthermore,  is the union of all

Norm on the idele group

The trace and the norm should be transfer from the adele ring to the idele group. It turns out the trace can't be transferred so easily. However, it is possible to transfer the norm from the adele ring to the idele group. Let  Then  and therefore, it can be said that in injective group homomorphism

Since  it is invertible,  is invertible too, because  Therefore  As a consequence, the restriction of the norm-function introduces a continuous function:

The Idele class group

Lemma. There is natural embedding of  into  given by the diagonal map: 

Proof.

Corollary.  is a discrete subgroup of 

Defenition.

Remark.  is closed in  therefore  is a locally compact topological group and a Hausdorff space.

Lemma. Let  be a finite extension. The embedding  induces an injective map:

Properties of the idele group

Absolute value on the idele group of K and 1-idele

Definition. For  define:  Since  is an idele this product is finite and therefore well-defined.

Remark.

Theorem.  is a continuous group homomorphism.

Proof. Let 

 

where it is used that all products are finite. The map is continuous which can be seen using an argument dealing with sequences. This reduces the problem to whether  is continuous on  However, this is clear, because of the reverse triangle inequality.

Definition.  The set of -idele can be defined as:

Artin's Product Formula.  for all 

Proof. Proof of the formula for number fields, the case of global function fields can be proved similarly. Let  be a number field and  It has to be shown that:

For finite place  for which the corresponding prime ideal  does not divide ,   and therefore  This is valid for almost all  There is:

 

The norm is in  so without loss of generality it can be assumed that  Then  possesses a unique integer factorisation:

Therefore:

Lemma. There exists a constant  depending only on  such that for every  satisfying  there exists  such that  for all 

Corollary.

Proof. Let  be the constant from the lemma. Let  be a uniformizing element of  Define the adele  via  with  minimal, so that  for all  Then  for almost all  Define  with  so that  This works, because  for almost all  By the Lemma there exists  so that  for all 

Theorem.  is discrete and cocompact in 

Proof. Since  is discrete in  it is also discrete in  To prove the compactness of  let  is the constant of the Lemma and suppose  satisfying  is given. Define:

Clearly  is compact. It can be claimed that the natural projection  is surjective. Let  be arbitrary, then:

and therefore

It follows that

By the Lemma there exists  such that  for all  and therefore  proving the surjectivity of the natural projection. Since it is also continuous the compactness follows.

Theorem.

Proof. Consider the map

This map is well-defined, since  for all  and therefore  Obviously  is a continuous group homomorphism. Now suppose  Then there exists  such that  By considering the infinite place it can be seen that  proves injectivity.

Hence  and there is:

Since

It has been concluded that  is surjective.

Theorem. The absolute value function induces the following isomorphisms of topological groups:

Proof. The isomorphisms are given by:

Relation between ideal class group and idele class group

Theorem. Let  be a number field with ring of integers  group of fractional ideals  and ideal class group  Here's the following isomorphisms

where  has been defined.

Proof.

 

The following map is well-defined:

 

The map  is obviously a surjective homomorphism and  The first isomorphism follows from fundamental theorem on homomorphism. Now, both sides are divided by  This is possible, because

Please, note the abuse of notation: On the left hand side in line 1 of this chain of equations,  stands for the map defined above. Later, the embedding of  into  is used. In line 2, the definition of the map is used. Finally, use 
that  is a Dedekind domain and therefore each ideal can be written as a product of prime ideals. In other words, the map  is a -equivariant group homomorphism. As a consequence, the map above induces a surjective homomorphism

 

For the last isomorphism note that  induces a surjective group homomorphism  with

Remark. Consider  with the idele topology and equip  with the discrete topology. Since  is open for each  is continuous. It stands, that  is open, where  so that

Decomposition of the idele group and idele class group of K

Theorem.

Proof.

 For  define:

 

Obviously,  is a homomorphism. To show it is injective, let  Since  for  it stands that  for  Moreover, it exists a  so that  for  Therefore,  for  Moreover  implies  where  is the number of infinite places of  As a consequence  and therefore  is injective.

The other equations follow similarly.

Characterisation of the idele group

Theorem. Let  be a number field. There exists a finite set of places  such that:

Proof. The class number of a number field is finite so let  be the ideals, representing the classes in  These ideals are generated by a finite number of prime ideals  Let  be a finite set of places containing  and the finite places corresponding to  Consider the isomorphism:

induced by

At infinite places the statement is immediate, so the statement has been proved for finite places. The inclusion ″″ is obvious.

Applications

Finiteness of the class number of a number field

In the previous section the fact that the class number of a number field is finite had been used. Here this statement can be proved:

Theorem (finiteness of the class number of a number field). Let  be a number field. Then 

Proof. The map

is surjective and therefore  is the continuous image of the compact set  Thus,  is compact. In addition, it is discrete and so finite.

Remark. There is a similar result for the case of a global function field. In this case, the so-called divisor group is defined. It can be shown that the quotient of the set of all divisors of degree  by the set of the principal divisors is a finite group.

Group of units and Dirichlet's unit theorem

Let  be a finite set of places. Define

An alternative definition is:  where  is a subring of  defined by

As a consequence,  contains all elements  which fulfil  for all 

Lemma 1. Let  The following set is finite:

Proof. Define

Lemma 2. Let  be set of all  such that  for all  Then  the group of all roots of unity of  In particular it is finite and cyclic.

Proof. Moreover  for each finite set of places  Finally suppose there exists  which is not a root of unity of  Then  for all  contradicting the finiteness of 

Dirichlet's Unit Theorem. Let  be a number field.

Remark. The Unit Theorem generalises Dirichlet's Unit Theorem. To see this, let  be a number field. It is already known that  set  and note  

Then there is:

Approximation theorems

Weak Approximation Theorem.

Strong Approximation Theorem. Let  be a place of  Define

Then  is dense in 

Remark. The global field is discrete in its adele ring.

Hasse principle

Hasse-Minkowski Theorem.

Remark. This is the Hasse principle for quadratic forms. For polynomials of degree larger than 2 the Hasse principle isn't valid in general. The idea of the Hasse principle (also known as local–global principle) is to solve a given problem of a number field  by doing so in its completions  and then concluding on a solution in

Characters on the adele ring

Definition. Let  be a locally compact abelian group.

Theorem. The adele ring is self-dual: 

Proof. By reduction to local coordinates, it is sufficient to show each  is self-dual. This can be done by using a fixed character of  The idea has been illustrated by showing  is self-dual. Define:

Then the following map is an isomorphism which respects topologies:

Theorem (algebraic and continuous duals of the adele ring).

Tate's thesis

With the help of the characters of  Fourier analysis can be done on the adele ring. John Tate in his thesis "Fourier analysis in Number Fields and Hecke Zeta Functions" proved results about Dirichlet L-functions using Fourier analysis on the adele ring and the idele group. Therefore, the adele ring and the idele group have been applied to study the Riemann zeta function and more general zeta functions and the L-functions. We can define adelic forms of these functions and we can represent them as integrals over the adele ring or the idele group, with respect to corresponding Haar measures. We can show functional equations and meromorphic continuations of these functions. For example, for all  with 

where  is the unique Haar measure on  normalized such that  has volume one and is extended by zero to the finite adele ring. As a result, the Riemann zeta function can be written as an integral over (a subset of) the adele ring.

Automorphic forms

The theory of automorphic forms is a generalization of Tate's thesis by replacing the idele group with analogous higher dimensional groups. To see this note:

Based on these identification a natural generalization would be to replace the idele group and the 1-idele with:

And finally

where  is the centre of  Then it define an automorphic form as an element of  In other words an automorphic form is a function on  satisfying certain algebraic and analytic conditions. For studying automorphic forms, it is important to know the representations of the group  It is also possible to study automorphic L-functions, which can be described as integrals over 

Further applications

The idele class group is a key object of class field theory, which describes abelian extensions of the field. The product of the local reciprocity maps in local class field theory gives a homomorphism of the idele group to the Galois group of the maximal abelian extension of the global field. The Artin reciprocity law, which is a sweeping generalisation of the Gauss quadratic reciprocity law, states that the product vanishes on the multiplicative group of the number field. Thus, the global reciprocity map of the idele class group to the abelian part of the absolute Galois group of the field will be obtained.

The self-duality of the adele ring of the function field of a curve over a finite field easily implies the Riemann–Roch theorem and the duality theory for the curve.

References

Sources
 366 pages.
 595 pages.
 294 pages.
 250 pages.

External links

 What problem do the adeles solve?
 Some good books on adeles

Algebraic number theory
Topological algebra